Pyotr Vladimirovich Berezin (born 8 May 1991) is a former Russian professional football player.

Club career
He made his Russian Football National League debut for FC Irtysh Omsk on 27 October 2010 in a game against FC Shinnik Yaroslavl. That was his only season in the FNL.

External links
 
 

1991 births
Living people
Russian footballers
Association football goalkeepers
FC Irtysh Omsk players